Reverend Claude Hinscliff (1875–1964) was a British suffragist.

Education and early career
Hinscliff studied for his licentiate in theology at Durham University. He matriculated in 1893 and was awarded a scholarship after performing well in the admissions exam. As a student he coxed for the university boat club. A member of Hatfield Hall, he graduated in 1896. As reported in 15 June 1897 edition of The Times, he was ordained a deacon in the Diocese of Norwich and attached to Parham and Hacheston in Suffolk. In December 1899 he was ordained a priest at St George in the Meadows, Nottingham. By 1905 he was Vicar of Bobbing in Kent.

Involvement with women's suffrage
Hinscliff is most notable for his involvement in the British suffrage movement. He founded the Anglican Church League for Women's Suffrage in 1909, and was its secretary for a long time. He and fellow member Charles Baumgarten (and, according to the Church Times, the Archdeacon of Lewisham, Charles Escreet), conducted the funeral service of Emily Davison in St. George's, Bloomsbury, where Baumgarten was vicar.

Later life
By 1913 he had become very uncomfortable with the militancy of suffragettes, which included arson attacks on churches, and as a result the Church League began to distance itself from the WSPU. He resigned his position as honorary organiser in 1914 on doctor's orders, having been diagnosed with myocarditis in 1911. He then worked in Europe. In 1920 he served on the staff of the Serbian Relief Fund and by March of the following year was established as British Chaplain in Belgrade. He soon moved on to Romania, where he served as the British Chaplain in Bucharest from 1921-1924.

Legacy
His name and picture (and those of 58 other women's suffrage supporters) are on the plinth of the statue of Millicent Fawcett in Parliament Square, London, unveiled in 2018.

References

British suffragists
Alumni of Hatfield College, Durham
20th-century English Anglican priests
Durham University Boat Club rowers